Tribute: Maison de M-Flo is a tribute album to M-Flo released by Rhythm Zone on September 16, 2009. The songs are newly remixed or have a new arrangement and each song is covered by a different artist.

Track listing

CD track listing
 Miss You / May J. & Jonte
 Come Again / Thelma Aoyama
 Planet Shining / Coma-Chi
 Yours only, feat. Wise / Kana Nishino
 Been So Long / Jejung & Yuchun (from Tohoshinki)
 Simple & Lovely / Misono
 The Love Bug / Yu-A
 Come Back To Me / Marie
 L.O.T. (Love or Truth) / Beni
 Let Go / Shota Shimizu

Charts
Oricon Sales Chart (Japan)

References 

2009 albums
M-Flo albums
Hip hop albums by Japanese artists
Tribute albums
Avex Group albums